The gare des Aubrais (before 2014: gare des Aubrais-Orléans) is a main-line railway station located in the town of Fleury-les-Aubrais in Loiret, central France, and serving the greater Orléans district. It is situated on the Paris to Bordeaux railway and is also the northern terminus of the Orléans to Montauban line. TGV and most other long-distance trains serve only the Gare des Aubrais, and not the more central Gare d'Orléans.

Services

The station is served by Intercités (long distance) services towards Paris and Toulouse, and by regional services (TER Centre-Val de Loire) to Orléans and Paris.

References

Railway stations in Loiret
Railway stations in France opened in 1843